The 13007 / 13008 Udyan Abha Toofan Express was an Express train belonging to Indian Railways – Eastern Railway zone that used to run between  and Sri Ganganagar in India.

It operated as train number 13007 from Howrah to Sri Ganganagar and as train number 13008 in the reverse direction, serving the 8 states of West Bengal, Jharkhand, Bihar, Uttar Pradesh, Haryana, Delhi, Punjab and Rajasthan. Eastern Railway cancelled its operations permanently from 19 May 2020.

Coaches
The 13007 / 08 Howrah–Sri Ganganagar Udyan Abha Toofan Express had 2 AC 3 tier, 1 AC 2 tier, 9 Sleeper class, 3 General Unreserved & 2 SLR (Seating cum Luggage Rake) coaches. It did not have a pantry car. In addition, it could carry up to 4 High Capacity Parcel Coaches.

Service
The 13007 Howrah–Sri Ganganagar Udyan Abha Toofan Express covered the distance of 1978 kilometres in 45 hours 25 mins (43.55 km/hr) & in 46 hours 20 mins as 13008 Sri Ganganagar–Howrah Udyan Abha Toofan Express (42.69 km/hr).

Routeing

Traction
As the route is partly electrified, a Howrah-based WAP-4 hauled the train from Howrah Junction up to  handing over to a Ludhiana-based WDM-3A which powered the train for the remainder of the journey.

Timings

13007 Howrah–Sri Ganganagar Udyan Abha Toofan Express left Howrah Junction on a daily basis and reached Sri Ganganagar on the 3rd day.
13008 Sri Ganganagar–Howrah Udyan Abha Toofan Express left Sri Ganganagar on a daily basis and reached Howrah Junction on the 3rd day.

References

External links
 
 
 

Rail transport in Howrah
Railway services introduced in 1930
Defunct trains in India
Rail transport in West Bengal
Rail transport in Jharkhand
Rail transport in Bihar
Rail transport in Uttar Pradesh
Rail transport in Haryana
Rail transport in Delhi
Rail transport in Rajasthan